Amir Ali is an American civil rights attorney and law professor who has argued multiple cases before the U.S. Supreme Court and testified before Congress. He is regarded as an expert in constitutional law and criminal procedure, including issues related to sentencing and habeas corpus, the right to counsel, police misconduct, and government accountability.

Ali is presently the Executive Director of the MacArthur Justice Center, a nonprofit law firm founded by philanthropist J. Roderick MacArthur.  Ali is also a professor at Harvard Law School, where he directs the law school's criminal justice appellate clinic. He serves on multiple Boards of Directors, including The Appellate Project and the Mosaic Theatre Company of D.C.

Early career 
After attending Harvard Law School, Ali served as a law clerk for Judge Raymond C. Fisher of the U.S. Court of Appeals for the Ninth Circuit and for Justice Marshall Rothstein of the Supreme Court of Canada. Ali previously practiced at the law firm Jenner & Block, where he argued before the U.S. Supreme Court as a fifth-year associate.

Notable cases
 Ali argued for the petitioner in Garza v. Idaho, in which the U.S Supreme Court established that a criminal defendant has the constitutional right to an appeal that has been forfeited by his attorney, even if the defendant's plea agreement states that it waives the right of appeal. 
 Ali argued for the petitioner in Welch v. United States, in which the U.S. Supreme Court held that prisoners who were sentenced to unconstitutional mandatory minimums were retroactively entitled to resentencing or release.
Ali represented the petitioner in Brumfield v. Cain, in which the U.S. Supreme Court reversed the death sentence of Louisiana death-row prisoner Kevan Brumfield and held that he was categorically ineligible for execution because he had an intellectually disability.
Ali represented Louisiana prisoner Corey Williams before the U.S. Supreme Court. Williams had been wrongfully convicted of capital murder at the age of 16, and spent over twenty years at Angola Penitentiary.
Ali filed a brief on behalf of the MacArthur Justice Center in Hawaii v. Trump, documenting President Trump's record of statements about Muslim people. Justice Sonia Sotomayor cited Ali's brief in her dissenting opinion.

References 

American lawyers
Living people
Year of birth missing (living people)
University of Waterloo alumni
Harvard Law School alumni